TLR may refer to:

Biology
Toll-like receptors, proteins of the immune system
Tonic labyrinthine reflex, in newborn humans

Travel
Suzuki TL1000R motorcycle
The IATA airport code for Mefford Field, California, USA
The ICAO airline code for Air Libya, Libya

Other
Twin-lens reflex camera
Tasteful Licks Records
Tony La Russa
Terra Lawson-Remer